CCPR may refer to:
Central Council of Physical Recreation
International Covenant on Civil and Political Rights
Chelatchie Prairie Railroad
California Center for Population Research

See also
CPR